The USSR Women's Volleyball Cup in ( Russian : Кубок СССР по волейболу среди женщин )  was a competition of the USSR women's volleyball teams, and it was contested first from 1950 to 1953, then from 1972 to 1991. 
The competition did not take place during the 1975 and 1979 seasons .

Cup Editions

See also
Volleyball in Russia 
Russian Women's Volleyball Cup

References

External links
Официальный сайт ВФВ

 
 

Volleyball competitions in the Soviet Union